Pseudophoxinus sojuchbulagi, also known as the Akstafa spring roach, is a species of ray-finned fish in the family Cyprinidae.
It is found in the Ağstafa Region of the Kura River in Azerbaijan. It was last recorded in 1948. None were found in two more recent searches.

References

Pseudophoxinus
Fish described in 1950